Joseph Paul Forgas (born 16 May 1947) is an Australian social psychologist, currently Scientia Professor at the University of New South Wales, Sydney, Australia. He was born in Budapest, Hungary and emigrated to Australia at the age of 22. He is married with two children, and lives in Sydney's Eastern Suburbs.

Biography

He obtained a First Class Honours degree from Macquarie University, and then received scholarships for study in West Germany, and at the University of Oxford, where he obtained his doctorate. Prof. Forgas has been a consistently active and productive researcher, investigating the influence of cognitive and affective processes on interpersonal behaviours. He was among the first to apply multidimensional scaling to the study of cognitive representations of social interaction episodes in memory.
 
Subsequently, he pioneered the systematic exploration of affective influences on social perceptions and judgments, mapping the boundary conditions for affect priming phenomena. He developed the first integrative theory of affective influences, the Affect infusion model (AIM). His experiments have made an important contribution to our understanding of affective influences on many important real-life judgments and behaviours, including survey responses, stereotyping and prejudice, social influence processes, organisational behaviours, bargaining and negotiation, verbal communication and consumer decisions.

His work received support from the Australian Research Council (ARC), including an ARC Professorial Fellowship, the ARC's Special Investigator Award, as well as international funding from the German Research Foundation, the Alexander von Humboldt Foundation, and the National Institutes of Mental Health, USA.

Joseph Forgas has published some 26 books, and over 200 articles and book chapters, and his work receives a high rate of citations and references. He received the prestigious Doctor of Science (DSC) degree from the University of Oxford, and was awarded the Distinguished Scientific Contribution Award by the Australian Psychological Society. He was elected for an inaugural Scientia Professorship by UNSW, and to Fellowships by the Academy of Social Sciences in Australia, as well as the Association for Psychological Science, the Society of Personality and Social Psychology, and the Hungarian Academy of Sciences. He also received the Research Prize from the Alexander von Humboldt Foundation, and a Rockefeller Fellowship for work in the Bellagio Centre. In recognition of his scientific and social contributions, in 2012 he was awarded the Order of Australia (AM).

Joseph Paul Forgas has initiated, and continues to organise and run an annual international social psychology symposium in Sydney, the Sydney Symposium of Social Psychology (SSSP), now in its 15th year. These meetings are held every year on a different topic, and bring together leading international researchers in a major field of social psychology The proceedings of each meeting are published annually by Psychology Press, New York, as the Sydney Symposium of Social Psychology Series.

Forgas is also co-editor of an international book series, 'Frontiers of Social Psychology' (Psychology Press, New York). He has been Associate Editor of Cognition and Emotion, and the Australian Journal of Psychology, and has been invited to the Editorial Boards of numerous leading journals. Prof. Forgas was Australia's Keynote Speaker at the International Congress of Psychology (Stockholm, 2000), and at the Conference of Italian Social Psychologists (Bari, 2003). His work is featured in many key reference books, textbooks and handbooks. Prof. Forgas is fluent in several languages (English, Hungarian, German, French), and he also maintains highly productive collaborative research links with leading overseas laboratories (Stanford, Heidelberg, British Columbia, Mannheim, etc.). His current project investigates affective influences on language and strategic interpersonal behaviours.

Books since 2000

Forgas, J.P. (Ed.) (2000). Feeling and thinking: Affective influences on social cognition. New York: Cambridge University Press.
Bless, H. & Forgas, J.P. (Eds.). (2000). The message within: Subjective experiences and social cognition. Philadelphia: Psychology Press.
Forgas, J.P. (Ed.) (2001). Handbook of affect and social cognition. Mahwah, New Jersey: Erlbaum.
Forgas, J.P. Williams, K. R. & Wheeler, L. (Eds.) (2001).  The social mind: Cognitive and motivational aspects of interpersonal behaviour. New York: Cambridge University Press. (Also published in Polish, 2005).
Ciarrochi, J.V. Forgas, J.P. & Mayer, J. D. (Eds.)  (2001).  Emotional intelligence in everyday life. Philadelphia: Psychology Press.
Forgas, J.P. & Williams, K. D. (Eds.). (2001). Social influence: Direct and indirect processes. Philadelphia: Psychology Press.
Forgas, J.P. & Williams, K.D. (Eds.) (2002). The social self: Individual, interpersonal and intergroup perspectives. New York: Psychology Press.
Forgas, J.P. Williams, K.D. & von Hippel, W. (Eds.) (2003). Social judgments: Explicit and implicit processes. New York: Cambridge University Press.
Forgas, J.P. Williams, K.D & Laham, S. (Eds.) (2004). Social Motivation: Conscious and unconscious processes. New York: Cambridge University Press.
Williams, K.D. Forgas, J.P. & von Hippel, W. (Eds.). (2005). The social outcast: Social rejection, exclusion and ostracism. New York: Psychology Press.
Ciarrochi, J.V. Forgas, J.P. & Mayer, J.D. (Eds.). (2005). Emotional intelligence in everyday life. (2nd edition). New York: Psychology Press.
Williams, K.D., Forgas, J.P. von Hippel, W. & Zadro, L. (Eds.). (2005). The social outcast: Ostracism, social exclusion, rejection and bullying. New York: Psychology Press.
Forgas, J.P. (Ed.) (2006). Affect, cognition and social behaviour. New York: Psychology Press.
Forgas, J.P. von Hippel, W. & Haselton, M. (Eds.). (2007). Evolutionary psychology and social cognition. New York: Psychology Press.

Bibliography

List of publications from Joseph Paul Forgas

References

Sources

Ki kicsoda 2000: Magyar és nemzetközi életrajzi lexikon, csaknem 20 000 kortársunk életrajza, főszerk. Hermann Péter, I–II, Budapest, Greger-Biográf, 1999, ISSN 1215-7066 – Forgács József Pál see I. volume 511. p. 
Joseph P. Forgas 
Forgács József and Hungarian Academy of Sciences 
Joseph P. Forgas's book in Hungarian 

Hungarian psychologists
Australian psychologists
Social psychologists
1947 births
Living people
Hungarian emigrants to Australia